Aerobic gymnastics at the 2009 Asian Indoor Games was held in Hải Phòng Gymnasium, Hải Phòng, Vietnam from 1 November to 3 November 2009.

Medalists

Medal table

Results

Men's individual

Elimination
1 November

Final
3 November

Women's individual

Elimination
2 November

Final
3 November

Mixed pair

Elimination
1 November

Final
3 November

Trio

Elimination
2 November

Final
3 November

References 
 Official site

2009 Asian Indoor Games events
Asian Indoor Games
2009 Aerobic